One Independent Olympic Athlete competed at the 2014 Summer Youth Olympics in Nanjing, China. The athlete was from South Sudan.

Background

South Sudan gained its independence from Sudan in June 2011. As of the 2014 Summer Youth Olympics, it had not formed a National Olympic Committee, implying that athletes from this nation were unable to enter with a National Olympic Committee (NOC). However the International Olympic Committee agreed to allow a runner to compete under the Olympic flag.

Athletics

One athlete was chosen to compete.

Girls
Track & road events

References

Nations at the 2014 Summer Youth Olympics